Jalan Bukit Katil or Jalan Tun Kudu (Malacca state route M144) is a dual-carriageway state road in Malacca state, Malaysia. It is also a main road to North–South Expressway Southern Route via 143 Lebuh Ayer Keroh.

List of junctions

Roads in Malacca